Graziadio (Hananel) Nepi (1759 – January 18, 1836), also known by the acronym Ḥen, was an Italian rabbi, Kabbalist, and physician.

Biography
Graziadio Nepi studied at Ferrara for twelve years under Rabbi  and subsequently was himself the teacher of many disciples in his native city. On account of his great Talmudic learning he was sent as deputy to the Assembly of Jewish Notables convened by Napoleon I at Paris in 1806. Upon his return he was called to the congregation at Cento, where he held the position of rabbi until his death, his pupil  becoming his successor at Ferrara.

Nepi, who lived an ascetic life, was one of the highest religious authorities of his time in Italy. Among his publications were Livyat Ḥen, a collection of the responsa which he sent to different rabbis, and Derushim, a collection of his sermons. His Zekher tsadikim li-verakhah, consisting of biographical and bibliographical sketches of rabbis and Jewish scholars, was intended to complete Azulai's Shem ha-gedolim but left unfinished. It was completed by M. S. Ghirondi under the title Toledot gedole Yisrael, and published by the latter's son (Triest, 1853). A catalogue of his library was published in Lemberg in 1873.

Selected publications

References

External links
 Works by Graziadio Nepi at the National Library of Israel

1759 births
1836 deaths
19th-century Italian physicians
19th-century Italian rabbis
Jewish physicians
Religious leaders from Ferrara